Government Complex, Daejeon station is a station of the Daejeon Metro Line 1 in Dunsan-dong, Seo District, Daejeon, South Korea. It is located between City Hall Station and Kalma Station of Daejeon City Railway Line 1. On the southern side of the station are the Bank of Korea, Eulji University Hospital, Seo-gu Office, and Sunmori Park. On the north side, there are Daejeon Government Building, Chungcheong Regional Statistical Office, Daejeon Government Complex Inter-City Bus Terminal, Dusan Seonja Site and Daejeon Regional Food and Drug Administration. There are also Boramae Crossing, Bukchung Crossing, Seokgung Crossing, and Prehistoric Crossing around government ministry.

References

External links
  Government Complex Daejeon Station from Daejeon Metropolitan Express Transit Corporation

Daejeon Metro stations
Seo District, Daejeon
Railway stations opened in 2006